Viktor Havrylovych Dohadailo (born 17 April 1960 in Kiev) is a Soviet retired footballer and Ukrainian football referee who currently serves as Ukrainian manager.

External links
 
 Biography at the FC Kazakhmys website
 Profile at the Odessa football website 

1960 births
Living people
Footballers from Kyiv
Soviet footballers
Association football midfielders
FC CSKA Kyiv players
FC Desna Chernihiv players
FC Okean Kerch players
Ukrainian Premier League managers
FC Knyazha Shchaslyve managers
FC Chornomorets Odesa managers
FC Desna Chernihiv managers
Expatriate football managers in Kazakhstan
Expatriate football managers in Moldova
Ukrainian expatriate football managers
CSF Bălți managers
FC Zirka Kropyvnytskyi managers
FC Okzhetpes managers
Ukrainian football managers
Ukrainian football referees
Moldovan Super Liga managers